A puddle is a small accumulation of liquid on a surface.

Puddle or Puddles may also refer to:
 Puddle, Cornwall, hamlet in England
 Puddle (video game)
 Puddle (M. C. Escher), a woodcut by M. C. Escher
 Weld puddle, a crucial part of the welding process
 In rowing, an oval patch of disturbed water indicative of rowing skill
 Puddle clay, a type of waterproof cement
 Puddle of Mudd, an American post-grunge band
 The Puddle, the New Zealand music group
 Puddles the Clown, the stage name of Mike Geier, and the associated band Puddles Pity Party

Puddling may refer to:
 Puddling (agriculture), wet tillage of rice paddies to prepare them for rice planting
 Puddling (biology), the process by which butterflies extract nutrients from damp surfaces
 Puddling (civil engineering), a method for producing waterproof puddle or lining an existing area with puddle clay
 Puddling (metallurgy), an obsolete method for purifying pig iron
 Puddling furnace, a metalmaking technology to create wrought iron from the pig iron produced in a blast furnace